Tiff is an unincorporated community in eastern Washington County, Missouri, United States. It is located approximately eight miles northeast of Potosi. The community was named for the barite ore found here, also known as "tiff". The community was founded as a company town in the early 1900s by John Cambel to house miners for his South East Missouri Barytes Company. A post office called Tiff has been in operation since 1905.

References 

Unincorporated communities in Washington County, Missouri
Unincorporated communities in Missouri